Yolanda Martin Franco (born February 16, 1954, in Guipúzcoa) is a boccia player from Spain.  She has cerebral palsy and is a BC3 type athlete.  She works as an administrator. She competed at the 1996 Summer Paralympics. She finished second in the BC1 one person event.  She competed at the 2000 Summer Paralympics. She  finished second in the two person BC3 event. She competed at the 2004 Summer Paralympics. She competed at the 2008 Summer Paralympics.  She  finished second in the two person BC3 event.

References 

1954 births
Living people
Spanish boccia players
Paralympic boccia players of Spain
Paralympic silver medalists for Spain
Paralympic medalists in boccia
Boccia players at the 1996 Summer Paralympics
Boccia players at the 2000 Summer Paralympics
Boccia players at the 2004 Summer Paralympics
Boccia players at the 2008 Summer Paralympics
Medalists at the 2000 Summer Paralympics
Medalists at the 2008 Summer Paralympics
Sportspeople from San Sebastián